is a private university in Kitanagoya, Aichi, Japan, founded in 1970.

External links
 

Educational institutions established in 1970
Private universities and colleges in Japan
Universities and colleges in Aichi Prefecture
1970 establishments in Japan
Kitanagoya, Aichi